This is a list of the Australian moth species of the family Tineodidae. It also acts as an index to the species articles and forms part of the full List of moths of Australia.

Anomima phaeochroa Turner, 1922
Cenoloba obliteralis (Walker, 1864)
Epharpastis daedala Meyrick, 1887
Euthesaura carbonaria Turner, 1922
Euthesaura glycina Turner, 1922
Euthrausta holophaea (Turner, 1908)
Euthrausta oxyprora (Turner, 1908)
Euthrausta phoenicea (Turner, 1908)
Oxychirota paradoxa Meyrick, 1885
Palaeodes samealis Hampson, 1913
Tanycnema anomala Turner, 1922
Tineodes adactylalis Guenée, 1854

External links 
Tineodidae at Australian insects

Australia